Gundlachia triantha, the TransPecos goldenshrub or Trans-Pecos desert goldenrod, is a North American species of plants in the sunflower family. It is native to northern Mexico (Chihuahua, Coahuila, Durango, Nuevo León), with the range extending just over the Río Grande into western Texas in and near Big Bend National Park.

The plant produces flower heads in clumps of 3–5 at the ends of small branches. Each head contains 3–7 disc flowers but no ray flowers.

References

External links
photo of herbarium specimen collected in Durango in 1994

Astereae
Flora of Mexico
Plants described in 1938
Flora of Texas